Umm al-Birak is a town in the Amman Governorate in northwestern Jordan.

References

External links
 Photos of Umm el-Burak at the American Center of Research

Populated places in Amman Governorate